Clementi MRT station is an above-ground Mass Rapid Transit (MRT) station on the East-West Line in Clementi, Singapore. The station will become an interchange station with the Cross Island Line in 2032.

The tracks between Clementi station and Jurong East MRT station are the second longest between any two stations on the East West Line; the longest being the tracks between Expo MRT station and Changi Airport MRT station. It takes four minutes for trains to travel between Clementi and Jurong East stations.

The station is also directly linked to the Clementi Mall and Clementi Bus Interchange. Together, they form the Clementi Integrated Transport Hub (ITH).

History

Construction of the Clementi MRT station began in May 1985 after the awarding of Contract 204 to LKN-Aoki venture and was completed in December 1987.

Clementi station opened on 12 March 1988, which is part of the Phase 1B of the MRT line. It travels from Outram Park to Clementi. This station is painted light blue.

On 5 August 1993, at around 7.53 am, two trains collided in the station. It appeared that one train had stopped at the station for longer than usual after experiencing a technical fault, and then a second westward train hit the first. 156 commuters were injured, many of whom were on their way to work. Eight were admitted to three hospitals, while the rest received outpatient treatment.

A four-member independent panel was subsequently formed by SMRT to conduct an inquiry into the accident. The panel was chaired by Chua Koon Hoe, deputy director-general of the Public Works Department of Singapore, with the members Chang Meng Teng, deputy chairman of the Public Transport Council, and Dr. Natarajan Varaprasad, principal of Temasek Polytechnic. Low Tien Sio, SMRTC's general manager (project administration) served as the secretary.

The results of the inquiry were announced by the SMRTC on 19 October 1993. Shortly after the accident The Straits Times had reported that an oil spill on the tracks was responsible for the second train's inability to brake in time. Some 50 litres of oil had spilled from a locomotive doing maintenance work on the track in the pre-dawn hours of 5 August. SMRT staff had been alerted to the spill and had dispatched a cleaning crew to the neighbouring Buona Vista, but approval to access the tracks was delayed. Already ten trains had reported difficulty braking on the track that morning. The 11th train had to use its emergency brakes upon reaching Clementi station, and while it was waiting for the brakes to be recharged so that it could move off again, the 12th approached the station and could not brake in time to avoid hitting the 11th train.

The Communications Minister at that time, Mah Bow Tan, said that as the SMRT staff followed procedures and none were found to be negligent, so no staff would be punished. However SMRT promised to look into the problem of oil spillage from maintenance locomotives by replacing the hoses and oil seals on all locomotives, checking all locomotives for leaks upon their return to depots, and assigning a station master to inspect tracks for oil. Procedures were also amended so that trains would not move off from stations preceding the spill until it had been cleaned up.

As with most of the stations along the East West Line, it was initially built without platform screen doors which prevents commuters from falling onto the train tracks. After several successful tests at Jurong East, Yishun and Pasir Ris, eventually, installation of the half-height screen doors started on 19 April 2010 and operations commenced on 16 August 2010. It was the fourth above-ground station to have half-height platform screen doors installed and in operation with Bukit Gombak. Also, the station has been installed with high-volume low-speed fans, which commenced operations on 3 October 2012.

Privacy screens were installed from Clementi MRT station to Clementi Avenue 2 and Clementi Avenue 1 to Clementi Road to minimise the impact of noise from residents. Installation works began in September 2016.

Cross Island line interchange
The station was first announced to interchange with the Cross Island line (CRL) on 20 September 2022 by Transport Minister S Iswaran. The CRL platforms will be constructed as part of CRL Phase 2, a  segment spanning six stations from Turf City station to Jurong Lake District station. The station is expected to be completed in 2032.

Station details 
The station is a three-level, above-ground structure with one island platform and four exits. The concourse station, like most of the above-ground stations on the East-West Line between Jurong East and Outram Park, has the street level above the concourse level, and the platforms. The station is situated along Commonwealth Avenue West, with Exit D leading to the road. It also connects to Clementi Mall and Clementi Bus Interchange, forming the Clementi Integrated Transport Hub.

The station will become an interchange with the Cross Island Line, starting from 2032.

References

External links

 

Railway stations in Singapore opened in 1988
Clementi
Mass Rapid Transit (Singapore) stations